Malicheh Sheykh (also Romanized as Mālīcheh Sheykh; also known as Mālcheh Sheykh, Māl-e Sheykh, Mālīcheh, and Māl-i-Shaikh) is a village in Mishan Rural District, Mahvarmilani District, Mamasani County, Fars Province, Iran. At the 2006 census, its population was 124, in 25 families.

References 

Populated places in Mamasani County